Nomadland is a 2020 American drama film written, produced, edited and directed by Chloé Zhao. Based on the 2017 nonfiction book Nomadland: Surviving America in the Twenty-First Century by Jessica Bruder, it stars Frances McDormand as a widow who leaves to travel around the United States in her van as a nomad. David Strathairn also stars in a supporting role. A number of real-life nomads appear as fictionalized versions of themselves, including Linda May, Swankie and Bob Wells.

Nomadland premiered on September 11, 2020, at the Venice Film Festival, where it won the Golden Lion. It also won the People's Choice Award at the Toronto International Film Festival. It had a one-week streaming limited release on December 4, 2020, and was distributed by Searchlight Pictures in selected IMAX theaters in the United States on January 29, 2021, and simultaneously in theaters, and streaming digitally on Hulu, on February 19, 2021. The film was a box office success, grossing $39 million worldwide against its $5 million budget and received widespread critical acclaim for its direction, editing, screenplay and cinematography, as well as the performances of McDormand and Strathairn. It was the third-highest rated film of 2020 on Metacritic, which found it to be the most frequently ranked by critics and publications as one of the best films of the year.

At the 93rd Academy Awards, it won Best Picture, Best Director, and Best Actress for McDormand, from a total of six nominations. Zhao became the first Asian woman and the second woman ever to win Best Director; McDormand became the first woman and fourth person to win Academy Awards for both acting and producing, and the first person ever to win Academy Awards as producer and performer for the same film. It is also the first Searchlight release to win Best Picture since the studio's ownership under Walt Disney Studios, following Disney's acquisition of the 21st Century Fox assets. It also won Best Motion Picture – Drama and Best Director at the 78th Golden Globe Awards, four awards including Best Film at the 74th British Academy Film Awards, and four awards including Best Film at the 36th Independent Spirit Awards.

Plot 
In 2011, Fern loses her job after the US Gypsum plant in Empire, Nevada shuts down; she worked there for years along with her husband, who recently died. Fern sells most of her belongings and purchases a van to live in and travel the country searching for work. She takes a seasonal job at an Amazon fulfillment center through the winter.

Linda, a friend and co-worker, invites Fern to visit a desert rendezvous in Arizona organized by Bob Wells, which provides a support system and community for fellow nomads. Fern initially declines, but changes her mind as the weather turns cold and she struggles to find work in the area. There, Fern meets fellow nomads and learns basic survival and self-sufficiency skills for the road.

When Fern's van blows a tire, she visits the van of a nearby nomad, Swankie, to ask for a ride into town to buy a spare. Swankie chastises Fern for not being prepared and invites her to learn road survival skills; they become friends. Swankie tells Fern about her cancer diagnosis and shortened life expectancy and her plan to make good memories on the road rather than waste away in a hospital. They eventually part ways.

Fern takes a job as a camp host at the Cedar Pass Campgrounds in Badlands National Park in South Dakota. Also working there is Dave, another nomad she met and danced with at the desert community. When he falls ill with diverticulitis, Fern visits him at the hospital where he has had emergency surgery. They take restaurant jobs at Wall Drug in South Dakota. One night, Dave's son visits the restaurant looking for him, telling him that his wife is pregnant and asking him to meet his grandchild. He is hesitant, but Fern encourages him to go. Dave suggests that she come with him, but she declines.

Fern takes a new job at a sugar beet processing plant, but her van breaks down, and she cannot afford the repairs. Unable to borrow money, she visits her sister's family at their home in California. Fern's sister lends her the money to get the van fixed. She questions why Fern was never around in their lives and why Fern stayed in Empire after her husband died, but she tells Fern she is brave to be so independent. Fern later visits Dave and his son's family, learning that Dave has decided to stay with them long-term. He admits feelings for her and invites her to stay with him permanently in a guest house, but she decides to leave after only a few days, heading to the ocean.

Fern returns to her seasonal Amazon job and later revisits the Arizona rendezvous. There, she learns that Swankie has died, and she and the other nomads pay tribute to her life by tossing stones into the campfire. Fern opens up to Bob about her loving relationship with her late husband, and he shares the story of his son's suicide. Bob espouses the view that goodbyes are not final in the nomad community as its members always promise to see each other again "down the road".

Fern returns to the nearly abandoned town of Empire to dispose of the belongings she has been keeping in a storage unit. She visits the factory and the home she shared with her husband before returning to the road.

Cast

Production 

Frances McDormand and Peter Spears optioned the film rights to the book in 2017. After seeing Chloé Zhao's film The Rider at the 2017 Toronto International Film Festival, McDormand decided to approach her about the project. She and Spears met with Zhao at the 33rd Independent Spirit Awards in March 2018, and Zhao agreed to write and direct the film.

Filming for Nomadland took place over four months in fall 2018, with writer-director Zhao splitting time between the set and pre-production for Eternals (2021). McDormand, Zhao, and other crew members lived out of vans over the course of production. David Strathairn, and real-life nomads Linda May, Swankie, and Bob Wells, also star. Many other real-life nomads appear throughout the film. McDormand, Spears, Mollye Asher, Dan Janvey, and Zhao produced the film.

Release 
Searchlight Pictures acquired the worldwide distribution rights for Nomadland in February 2019. The film had its world premiere at the Venice Film Festival on September 11, 2020, and screened at the Toronto International Film Festival on the same day. At Venice, the film won several awards, including the festival's top honor, the Golden Lion. At Toronto, the film won the People's Choice Award. It is the first film to win the top prize at both Venice and Toronto.

In association with Searchlight, Film at Lincoln Center held exclusive virtual screenings of the film for one week only beginning on December 4, 2020, the film's initial release date before Searchlight delayed it to February 19, 2021, due to concerns of the COVID-19 pandemic. It was released in IMAX theaters on January 29, 2021, with a wide theatrical and drive-in release in the United States on February 19, and streaming on Hulu the same day. A two-week preview season in certain regions of Australia and New Zealand began on December 26, 2020, before a wider release on March 4, 2021.

Internationally, the film is also available on Disney+ and Disney+ Hotstar. The release date on Disney+ was April 9, 2021 in Canada, and April 30, 2021, in most other countries. Although originally scheduled for a limited release in China starting on April 23, 2021, the film has still not been shown in any theaters there.

Nomadland was released on Blu-ray and digital streaming services on April 27, 2021, by Walt Disney Studios Home Entertainment.

Reception

Box office 
Nomadland grossed $3.7 million in the United States and Canada, and $35.4 million in other territories, for a worldwide total of $39.1 million.

Although Searchlight did not publicly release Nomadland'''s grosses, it was released in North America the same day as The Little Things, and sources estimated a gross of $170,000 from its two-week IMAX run, then $503,000 from 1,175 theaters in its wide opening weekend on February 19, for a total of $673,000. Social media monitor RelishMix noted online response was "mixed-to-leaning-positive" among audiences. In its second wide release weekend, it earned an estimated $330,000 from 1,200 theaters, for a four-week running total of $1.1 million.

 Critical response 

The website's critics consensus reads, "A poetic character study on the forgotten and downtrodden, Nomadland beautifully captures the restlessness left in the wake of the Great Recession." According to Metacritic, which assigned it a weighted average score of 91 out of 100 based on 54 critics, the film received "universal acclaim".

Writing for The Hollywood Reporter, David Rooney called the film a "powerful character study", and added, "Like Zhao's earlier work, Nomadland is an unassuming film, its aptly meandering, unhurried non-narrative layering impressions rather than building a story with the standard markers. But the cumulative effect of its many quiet, seemingly inconsequential encounters and moments of solitary contemplation is a unique portrait of outsider existence." Adrian Horton of The Guardian gave the film a positive review, stating, "Nomadland has garnered industry praise as a likely frontrunner for the best picture Oscar ... The word of mouth is warranted." A.O. Scott of The New York Times similarly gave a positive review, writing "It's like discovering a new country, one you may want to visit more than once." Eric Kohn of IndieWire gave the film an "A−" and said, "director Chloé Zhao works magic with McDormand's face and the real world around it, delivering a profound rumination on the impulse to leave society in the dust." Some reviewers felt the film idealized financial despair. Critic Tim Brayton called it "108 minutes of poverty tourism", while WBUR's Sean Burns wrote "Zhao has made The Grapes of Wrath without the wrath".

IndieWire's poll of 231 critics included Nomadland in its Best Movies of 2020. According to Metacritic, the film was ranked the best of 2020 by critics more often than any other.

Reaction in China
Zhao and the film's success prior to and leading up to the Golden Globes and the Oscars were initially praised on Chinese social media outlets, as well as official state-controlled news media.

After the Golden Globes, Zhao was scrutinized by Chinese netizens over her remarks in a 2013 interview for Filmmaker magazine, in which she described China as "a place where there are lies everywhere". In response to the controversy, Nomadland was pulled from theatrical release by Disney China, and the 93rd Academy Awards were censored by Chinese media outlets along with all mention of Zhao or the film on social media.

 Accolades Nomadland won the Golden Lion upon premiering at the Venice Film Festival, and also won the People's Choice Award at the Toronto International Film Festival. It received four nominations at the 78th Golden Globe Awards, winning Best Motion Picture – Drama and Best Director; in winning the latter award, Zhao became the second woman and the first East Asian woman to do so. It received five nominations at the 36th Independent Spirit Awards and six nominations at the 26th Critics’ Choice Awards, winning four awards including Best Picture, Best Director and Best Adapted Screenplay. At the 27th Screen Actors Guild Awards, McDormand received a nomination for Outstanding Performance by a Female Actor in a Leading Role.
The film won the BAFTA Award for Best Film in 2021.Nomadland Wins Best Film | EE BAFTA Film Awards 2021 - via www.youtube.com. The film received six nominations at the 93rd Academy Awards, winning Best Director (with Zhao becoming the  second woman and first non-white woman to do so), Best Picture, and Best Actress awards in 2021. Both the National Board of Review and the American Film Institute named Nomadland'' as one of the top 10 films of 2020.

See also 
 Empire, Nevada

References

External links 

 
 
 
 
 Script 

2020 drama films
2020s drama road movies
American drama road movies
BAFTA winners (films)
Best Drama Picture Golden Globe winners
Best Film BAFTA Award winners
Best Picture Academy Award winners
Films about homelessness
Films about vans
Films based on non-fiction books
Films directed by Chloé Zhao
Films featuring a Best Actress Academy Award-winning performance
Films scored by Ludovico Einaudi
Films set in the 2010s
Films set in 2011
Films set in 2012
Films set in 2013
Films set in Arizona
Films set in California
Films set in Nebraska
Films set in Nevada
Films set in South Dakota

Films shot in California
Films shot in Nebraska
Films shot in Nevada
Films shot in South Dakota
Films whose director won the Best Directing Academy Award
Films whose director won the Best Director Golden Globe
Golden Lion winners
Independent Spirit Award for Best Film winners
National Society of Film Critics Award for Best Film winners
Toronto International Film Festival People's Choice Award winners
Searchlight Pictures films
IMAX films
Films about grieving
Films about widowhood
Film controversies in China
Film censorship in China
2020s English-language films
2020s American films
2020 independent films